Ishtixon is a city in Samarqand Region, Uzbekistan. It is the capital of Ishtixon District. In 1989, the population was 10,155 people, and 16,000 in 2016.

References

Populated places in Samarqand Region
Cities in Uzbekistan